Salva Nos (Save Us) is the debut album by British vocal group Mediæval Bæbes.

Reception

The album reached number two on the UK specialist classical album chart, and was certified silver by the BPI on 15 May 1998. More generally, the album spent eight weeks on the UK top 100 album chart, peaking at sixty-two.

Track listing

 Salve Virgo Virginum
 Now Springes the Spray
 Ah Si Mon Moine 
 Adam Lay Ibounden
 Foweles in the Frith 
 So Treiben Wir Den Winter Aus 
 The Coventry Carol 
 Gaudete 
 Adult Lullaby 
 Veni, Veni 
 Salva Nos
 Verbum Caro
 Lo, Here My Hert 
 Binnorie O Binnorie 
 This Ay Nicht 
 Miri It Is

References

1998 debut albums
Mediæval Bæbes albums